Castell de l'Airosa is a rocky mountain in the eastern side of the Ports de Tortosa-Beseit, Catalonia, Spain. 
Its summit has an altitude of 953.8 metres above sea level.

Castell de l'Airosa, is a spectacular looking mountain. Its name includes the term castell —"castle" in Catalan— for the mountain looks very much like a castle when viewed from certain angles.

See also
Ports de Tortosa-Beseit
Mountains of Catalonia
Iberian System

References

External links
Castell de l'Airosa - Google Maps
Imatges de l'ascensió al Castell de l'Airosa 30-04-2012 
Els Ports - Castell de l'Airosa 

Ports de Tortosa-Beseit
Baix Ebre